Steve DeVries (born December 8, 1964) is a former professional tennis player from the United States.

DeVries enjoyed most of his tennis success while playing doubles.  During his career he won 4 doubles titles and finished runner-up an additional 5 times.  He achieved a career-high doubles ranking of world no. 18 in 1993.  During his tour days DeVries lived in San Mateo, California. Steve is currently the Head Tennis Professional at Green Valley Country Club in Fairfield, California.

ATP Tour finals

Doubles (4 wins, 5 losses)

External links
 
 

1964 births
Living people
American male tennis players
American people of Dutch descent
California Golden Bears men's tennis players
People from San Mateo, California
Tennis people from California
Tennis players from Cincinnati